Tetrapleuroceras is an extinct prehistoric nautiloid from the Lower Permian of the Urals in Russia. Nautilids are a type of nautiloid, a subclass of shelled cephalopods that were once diverse and numerous but now only represented by Nautilus and Allonautilus

Tetrapleuroceras is one of two genera that Shimianky combined as the Neptunoceratidae in 1957, the other being Neptunoceras. The Neptunoceratidae, according to Rousseau Flower (1963) is doubtfully distinct from the Scyphoceratidae, a family from the Lower Permian included in the Aipocerataceae.( 1964.

The Scyphoceratidae, to which Tetrapleuroceras is assigned (Flower 1963) are cyrtoconic or possibly loosely coiled nautilids with smooth or ribbed shell, generally short phragmocones, and slightly expanded siphuncle segments.

See also

 Nautiloid
 List of nautiloids

References
 Flower, R. H. (January 1963). Two Permian Cyrtocones from New Mexico.....Journal of Paleontology, V.37, no.1, 86-96. 
 Kummel, B. (1964). Nautiloidea-Nautilida, Treatise on Invertebrate Paleontology Part K, Teichert et al.
 Sepkoski, J. J. Jr. (2002). A compendium of fossil marine animal genera. D.J. Jablonski & M.L. Foote (eds.). Bulletins of American Paleontology 363: 1–560. Sepkoski's Online Genus Database (CEPHALOPODA)

Nautiloids